The Cameroonian National Action Movement (MANC) was a political party in French Cameroons.

History
The party was created in March 1956 as by the merger of the Bantu Efoula-Meyong Traditional Association led by Charles Assalé and members of the Ngondo establishment led by Soppo Priso. The French authorities regarded it as a front for the banned Union of the Peoples of Cameroon.

The party contested the December 1956 Territorial Assembly elections. It received 6.7% of the vote, winning 8 of the 70 seats. Its eight MPs became known as the "Group of Eight", who were opposed to the increasing domination of the Cameroonian Union led by Ahmadou Ahidjo. However, it joined Ahidjo's government in 1958.

Prior to the 1960 elections the party formed the Group of Cameroonian Progressives together with the Socialist Party of Cameroon. The alliance won seven seats, and Assalé became Prime Minister. However, the alliance was dissolved the following year as it merged into the Cameroonian Union.

MPs

References

Defunct political parties in Cameroon
Political parties established in 1956
Political parties disestablished in 1961
1956 establishments in French Cameroon
1961 disestablishments in Cameroon